Suzana Pribilović (born 1972 in Cetinje) is a Montenegrin judge and politician, former Minister of Public Administration since was appointed by Duško Marković  on 28 November 2016, and until 4 December 2020. Graduated in Laws by the University of Belgrade Faculty of Law, she served as judge of the Basic Court in Kotor. She is member of the Democratic Party of Socialists and was member of the Parliament of Montenegro, until 2016, and again since 2020 elections.

References

  

1972 births
Living people
Politicians from Cetinje
Government ministers of Montenegro
Montenegrin women in politics
University of Belgrade alumni
Democratic Party of Socialists of Montenegro politicians
Members of the Parliament of Montenegro
Women government ministers of Montenegro